Nostoc verrucosum is a species of cyanobacteria usually found in colonies and in globose racks. It has a greenish to blackish color. It grows in creek beds, shallow streams, waterfalls, and moist understory in rain forests, in alkaline soil and water habitat. Colonies are velvety to the touch.

Like other Nostoc species, this organism fixes nitrogen and provides important nutrients for plants, forming a symbiotic interaction with them.

It can withstand freezing and thawing cycles and can survive extreme conditions in places such as the Arctic and Antarctica.

It can stay dormant for long periods of time and abruptly recover metabolic activity when rehydrated. Like all other prokaryotic organisms, it is without organized nucleus and 70%-85% of its cytoplasm is water.

References
Dodds, Walter K. The Ecology of Nostoc. Journal of Phycology vol 33(1) February 1995. 2–18.
Ehling-Schultz, Monika et al. UV-B-induced synthesis of photoprotective pigments and extracellular polysaccharides in the terrestrial cyanobacterium Nostoc commune. Journal of Bacteriology vol 179(6) March 1997. 1940–1945.
James, Paul. Nostoc. Microscopy-UK.
(Cyanobacteria). Nikon Microscopy.
Scherer, S. et al. A new UV-A/B protecting pigment in the terrestrial cyanobacterium Nostoc commune. Plant Physiology vol 88 1988. 1055–1057.
Webb, David T. Cycad Root Nodules. Botany Department, University of Hawai'i at Manoa.
Zipcodezoo Profile

Nostocaceae